Brovary is a railway station located in Brovary, Ukraine.

External links
 Station timetable

Railway stations in Kyiv Oblast
Railway stations opened in 1868
Brovary